Paekna is a village in Kiili Parish, Harju County in northern Estonia.

References
 

Villages in Harju County